This is a list of the Australian moth species of the family Pyralidae. It also acts as an index to the species articles and forms part of the full List of moths of Australia.

Subfamily Chrysauginae
Anassodes mesozonalis (Hampson, 1917)
Anemosa exanthes (Meyrick, 1885)
Anemosa isadasalis Walker, 1859
Hednotodes callichroa Lower, 1893
Hednotodes metaxantha (Hampson, 1918)
Polyterpnes polyrrhoda Turner, 1932

Subfamily Crambinae
Anaclastis apicistrigellus (Meyrick, 1879)
Ancylolomia westwoodi Zeller, 1863
Autarotis milvellus (Meyrick, 1879)
Autarotis polioleuca (Turner, 1911)
Batiana remotella Walker, 1866
Bissetia subfumalis (Hampson, 1896)
Bleszynskia malacelloides (Bleszynski, 1955)
Calamotropha delatalis (Walker, 1863)
Calamotropha dielota (Meyrick, 1886)
Calamotropha haplorus (Turner, 1911)
Calamotropha leptogrammellus (Meyrick, 1879)
Calamotropha paludella (Hübner, 1824)
Catancyla brunnea Hampson, 1919
Charltoniada acrocapna (Turner, 1911)
Chilo crypsimetalla (Turner, 1911)
Conocrambus medioradiellus (Hampson, 1919)
Conocrambus xuthochroa (Turner, 1947)
Corynophora argentifascia (Hampson, 1919)
Corynophora lativittalis (Walker, 1863)
Corynophora torrentellus (Meyrick, 1879)
Culladia cuneiferellus (Walker, 1863)
Culladia hastiferalis (Walker, 1865)
Deanolis sublimbalis Snellen, 1899
Diadexia anchylocrossa Turner, 1924
Diadexia argyropasta Turner, 1911
Diadexia parodes Turner, 1905
Epiecia externella Walker, 1866
Euchromius cornus Schouten, 1990
Eurhythma argyphea (Turner, 1913)
Eurhythma callipepla (Turner, 1915)
Eurhythma cataxia (Turner, 1913)
Eurhythma epargyra (Turner, 1913)
Eurhythma latifasciella Turner, 1904
Eurhythma polyzelota (Turner, 1913)
Eurhythma xuthospila (Turner, 1913)
Friedlanderia phaeochorda (Turner, 1911)
Gadira petraula (Meyrick, 1882)
Glaucocharis alypophanes (Turner, 1904)
Glaucocharis dilatella (Meyrick, 1879)
Glaucocharis microxantha (Meyrick, 1897)
Glaucocharis molydocrossa (Turner, 1904)
Glaucocharis ochracealis (Walker, 1866)
Glaucocharis pauli Gaskin, 1985
Glaucocharis pogonias (Turner, 1911)
Glaucocharis queenslandensis (Gaskin, 1975)
Glaucocharis stenura (Turner, 1904)
Glaucocharis torva (T.P. Lucas, 1898)
Hednota acontophora (Meyrick, 1882)
Hednota ancylosticha Koch, 1966
Hednota argyroeles (Meyrick, 1882)
Hednota asterias Meyrick, 1887
Hednota aurantiacus (Meyrick, 1879)
Hednota bathrotricha (Lower, 1902)
Hednota bifractellus (Walker, 1863)
Hednota bivittella (Donovan, 1805)
Hednota cotylophora (Turner, 1942)
Hednota crypsichroa Lower, 1893
Hednota cyclosema (Lower, 1896)
Hednota demissalis (Walker, 1863)
Hednota diacentra (Meyrick, 1897)
Hednota diargyra (Turner, 1925)
Hednota dichospila (Turner, 1937)
Hednota empheres Koch, 1966
Hednota enchias (Meyrick, 1897)
Hednota eremenopa (Lower, 1903)
Hednota grammellus (Zeller, 1863)
Hednota hagnodes (Turner, 1942)
Hednota haplotypa (Turner, 1904)
Hednota hoplitellus (Meyrick, 1879)
Hednota icelomorpha (Turner, 1906)
Hednota impletellus (Walker, 1863)
Hednota invalidellus (Meyrick, 1879)
Hednota koojanensis Koch, 1966
Hednota longipalpella (Meyrick, 1879)
Hednota macroura (Lower, 1902)
Hednota megalarcha (Meyrick, 1885)
Hednota mesochra (Lower, 1896)
Hednota ocypetes Meyrick, 1936
Hednota odontoides Koch, 1966
Hednota opulentellus (Zeller, 1863)
Hednota orthotypa (Turner, 1904)
Hednota panselenella (Meyrick, 1882)
Hednota panteucha (Meyrick, 1885)
Hednota pedionoma (Meyrick, 1885)
Hednota peripeuces (Turner, 1942)
Hednota perlatalis (Walker, 1863)
Hednota pleniferellus (Walker, 1863)
Hednota polyargyra (Turner, 1913)
Hednota recurvellus (Walker, 1863)
Hednota relatalis (Walker, 1863)
Hednota stenipteralis (Lower, 1903)
Hednota tenuilineata Koch, 1966
Hednota thologramma Meyrick, 1936
Hednota toxotis Meyrick, 1887
Hednota trissomochla (Turner, 1911)
Hednota urithrepta (Turner, 1925)
Hednota xiphosema (Turner, 1904)
Hednota xylophaea Meyrick, 1887
Mesolia pelopa (Turner, 1947)
Mesolia scythrastis Turner, 1904
Microchilo gelastis (Meyrick, 1887)
Microtalis epimetalla Turner, 1911
Neargyria argyraspis (Meyrick, 1879)
Neargyria persimilis Hampson, 1919
Neargyrioides aglaopis (Turner, 1911)
Nechilo macrogona (Lower, 1902)
Platytes platysticha Turner, 1939
Platytes poliopepla Lower, 1905
Prionapteryx diffusilinea (Hampson, 1919)
Prionapteryx hedyscopa (Lower, 1905)
Prionapteryx termia (Meyrick, 1885)
Pseudocatharylla photoleuca (Lower, 1903)
Ptochostola asaphes Turner, 1937
Ptochostola dirutellus (Walker, 1866)
Ptochostola microphaeellus (Walker, 1866)
Tauroscopa callixutha Turner, 1925
Tauroscopa lachnaea (Turner, 1913)
Tawhitia pentadactylus (Zeller, 1863)
Ubida amochla Turner, 1922
Ubida hetaerica Turner, 1911
Ubida holomochla Turner, 1904
Ubida ramostriellus (Walker, 1863)
Xubida infusellus (Walker, 1863)

Subfamily Cybalomiinae
Analcina penthica Turner, 1911
Apoblepta epicharis Turner, 1911
Centropseustis astrapora Meyrick, 1890
Hendecasis melalophalis Hampson, 1906
Ptychopseustis amoenella (Snellen, 1880)
Ptychopseustis eutacta (Turner, 1908)
Ptychopseustis molybdogramma (Hampson, 1919)
Thyridiphora gilva Turner, 1926
Trichophysetis crocoplaga Lower, 1903
Trichophysetis fulvifusalis Lower, 1903
Trichophysetis neophyla Meyrick, 1884
Trichophysetis poliochyta Turner, 1911

Subfamily Endotrichinae
Endosimilis stilbealis (Walker, 1859)
Endotricha approximalis Snellen, 1895
Endotricha chionocosma Turner, 1904
Endotricha dispergens T.P. Lucas, 1891
Endotricha euphiles Turner, 1932
Endotricha hemicausta Turner, 1904
Endotricha ignealis Guenée, 1854
Endotricha lobibasalis Hampson, 1906
Endotricha melanchroa Turner, 1911
Endotricha mesenterialis (Walker, 1859)
Endotricha occidentalis Hampson, 1916
Endotricha psammitis Turner, 1904
Endotricha puncticostalis (Walker, 1866)
Endotricha pyrosalis Guenée, 1854
Endotricha pyrrhocosma Turner, 1911
Larodryas haplocala Turner, 1922
Oenogenes congrualis (Walker, 1866)
Oenogenes fugalis (R. Felder & Rogenhofer, 1875)
Persicoptera aglaopa (Meyrick, 1887)
Persicoptera baryptera (Lower, 1905)
Persicoptera callimochla (Turner, 1913)
Persicoptera compsopa (Meyrick, 1887)
Persicoptera desmotoma (Lower, 1903)
Persicoptera dinosticha (Turner, 1937)
Persicoptera iochyta (Turner, 1911)
Persicoptera pulchrinalis (Guenée, 1854)
Persicoptera scioides (Turner, 1932)

Subfamily Epipaschiinae
Agastophanes zophoxysta Turner, 1937
Araeopaschia demotis (Meyrick, 1887)
Araeopaschia normalis (Hampson, 1906)
Araeopaschia rufescentalis Hampson, 1906
Astrapometis saburalis (Walker, 1859)
Austropaschia porrigens Hampson, 1916
Axiocrita cataphanes Turner, 1913
Canipsa poliochyta (Turner, 1904)
Catamola funerea (Walker, 1863)
Catamola xanthomelalis (Walker, 1863)
Doddiana callizona (Lower, 1896)
Lacalma albirufalis (Hampson, 1916)
Lacalma ferrealis (Hampson, 1906)
Lacalma mniomima (Turner, 1913)
Lacalma papuensis (Warren, 1891)
Lacalma poryphryealis (Kenrick, 1907)
Mimaglossa amauropis (Turner, 1926)
Mimaglossa crypserythra (Turner, 1904)
Mimaglossa habitalis (Guenée, 1854)
Mimaglossa nauplialis (Walker, 1859)
Mimaglossa zophera (Turner, 1904)
Nyctereutica asbolopis Turner, 1904
Nyctereutica capnopis (Meyrick, 1885)
Nyctereutica elassota (Meyrick, 1884)
Nyctereutica melanophorella (Walker, 1866)
Nyctereutica tephrophanes (Turner, 1937)
Nyctereutica tornotis (Meyrick, 1887)
Nyctereutica tympanophora (Turner, 1904)
Odontopaschia ecnomia Turner, 1913
Orthaga amphimelas Turner, 1913
Orthaga chloanthes (Turner, 1913)
Orthaga exvinacea (Hampson, 1891)
Orthaga lithochroa Hampson, 1916
Orthaga phaeopteralis Lower, 1902
Orthaga picta (Warren, 1895)
Orthaga polyscia (Turner, 1913)
Orthaga rubridiscalis Hampson, 1906
Orthaga seminivea (Warren, 1895)
Orthaga thyrisalis (Walker, 1858)
Poliopaschia brachypalpia Hampson, 1916
Poliopaschia lithochlora (Lower, 1896)
Pseudocera trissosticha (Turner, 1932)
Salma apicalis (Kenrick, 1907)
Salma basiochra (Turner, 1937)
Salma cholica (Meyrick, 1884)
Salma cletolis (Turner, 1905)
Salma ebenina (Turner, 1904)
Salma eupepla (Turner, 1915)
Salma galeata (Hampson, 1906)
Salma glyceropa (Turner, 1937)
Salma hicanodes (Turner, 1937)
Salma marmorea (Warren, 1891)
Salma mnesibrya (Meyrick, 1884)
Salma nephelodes (Turner, 1933)
Salma nubilalis (Hampson, 1893)
Salma peloscia (Turner, 1913)
Salma pentabela (Turner, 1915)
Salma peratophaea (Turner, 1937)
Salma poliophanes (Turner, 1913)
Salma pyrastis (Meyrick, 1887)
Salma recurvalis Walker, 1863
Salma streptomela (Lower, 1896)
Salma tholoessa (Turner, 1926)
Spectrotrota fimbrialis Warren, 1891
Stericta aeruginosa T.P. Lucas, 1894
Stericta atribasalis Warren, 1895
Stericta bryomima (Turner, 1913)
Stericta carbonalis (Guenée, 1854)
Stericta chlorophoena Turner, 1913
Stericta concisella (Walker, 1866)
Stericta dochmoscia (Turner, 1905)
Stericta mediovialis Hampson, 1916
Stericta orchidivora (Turner, 1904)
Stericta philobrya (Turner, 1937)
Stericta prasina Warren, 1895
Termioptycha Meyrick, 1889
Termioptycha eucarta (R. Felder & Rogenhofer, 1875)
Titanoceros cataxantha Meyrick, 1884
Titanoceros heliodryas Meyrick, 1933
Titanoceros thermoptera (Lower, 1903)

Subfamily Evergestinae
Crocidolomia luteolalis Hampson, 1893
Crocidolomia pavonana (Fabricius, 1794)
Crocidolomia suffusalis (Hampson, 1891)

Subfamily Galleriinae
Achroia grisella (Fabricius, 1794)
Aphomia baryptera (Lower, 1901)
Aphomia erumpens T.P. Lucas, 1898
Aphomia homochroa (Turner, 1905)
Aphomia poliocyma Turner, 1937
Aphomia sociella (Linnaeus, 1758)
Bapara agasta (Turner, 1911)
Callionyma sarcodes Meyrick, 1883
Corcyra cephalonica (Stainton, 1866)
Dinopleura lineata Turner, 1941
Doloessa hilaropis (Meyrick, 1897)
Doloessa ochrociliella (Ragonot, 1893)
Doloessa viridis Zeller, 1848
Galleria mellonella (Linnaeus, 1758)
Galleristhenia biangularis (Turner, 1941)
Galleristhenia idioptila (Turner, 1915)
Galleristhenia mellonidiella Hampson, 1917
Galleristhenia sporadica (Turner, 1947)
Heteromicta aegidia (Meyrick, 1887)
Heteromicta alypeta Turner, 1911
Heteromicta leucospila (Lower, 1907)
Heteromicta melanomochla (Hampson, 1917)
Heteromicta myrmecophila (Turner, 1905)
Heteromicta nigricostella Hampson, 1901
Heteromicta ochraceella Hampson, 1901
Heteromicta pachytera (Meyrick, 1880)
Heteromicta phloeomima (Turner, 1911)
Heteromicta poeodes Turner, 1905
Heteromicta poliostola Turner, 1904
Heteromicta sordidella (Walker, 1866)
Heteromicta tripartitella (Meyrick, 1880)
Hypolophota amydrastis Turner, 1904
Hypolophota oodes Turner, 1904
Lamoria eumeces (Turner, 1913)
Lamoria idiolepida Turner, 1922
Lamoria oenochroa Turner, 1905
Lamoria pachylepidella Hampson, 1901
Mampava rhodoneura (Turner, 1905)
Mecistophylla agramma (Lower, 1903)
Mecistophylla amechanica Turner, 1941
Mecistophylla asthenitis (Turner, 1904)
Mecistophylla disema (Lower, 1905)
Mecistophylla ebenopasta (Turner, 1904)
Mecistophylla psara Turner, 1937
Mecistophylla spodoptera (Lower, 1907)
Mecistophylla stenopepla (Turner, 1904)
Meyriccia latro (Zeller, 1873)
Paralipsa gularis (Zeller, 1877)
Picrogama semifoedalis (Walker, 1866)
Prosthenia xyloryctella Hampson, 1917
Tirathaba catharopa (Turner, 1937)
Tirathaba cissinobaphes (Turner, 1906)
Tirathaba leucostictalis (Lower, 1903)
Tirathaba monoleuca (Lower, 1894)
Tirathaba parasiticus (T.P. Lucas, 1898)
Tirathaba pseudocomplana Hampson, 1917
Tirathaba psolopasta (Turner, 1913)
Tirathaba rufivena (Walker, 1864)
Tirathaba ruptilinea (Walker, 1866)
Tirathaba xuthoptera (Turner, 1937)

Subfamily Glaphyriinae
Hellula hydralis Guenée, 1854
Hellula undalis (Fabricius, 1781)

Subfamily Midilinae
Dolichobela celidograpta Turner, 1932
Styphlolepis agenor Turner, 1915
Styphlolepis delopasta Turner, 1942
Styphlolepis erythrocosma Turner, 1942
Styphlolepis hypermegas Turner, 1922
Styphlolepis leucosticta Hampson, 1919
Styphlolepis squamosalis Hampson, 1896

Subfamily Musotiminae
Baeoptila leptorrhoda (Turner, 1908)
Baeoptila oculalis (Hampson, 1897)
Baeoptila selenias Turner, 1908
Drosophantis caeruleata (Hampson, 1893)
Elachypteryx callidryas (Turner, 1922)
Elachypteryx erebenna Turner, 1908
Musotima acrias Meyrick, 1884
Musotima leucomma (Hampson, 1917)
Musotima nitidalis (Walker, 1866)
Musotima ochropteralis (Guenée, 1854)
Musotima pudica (T.P. Lucas, 1894)
Musotima suffusalis (Hampson, 1893)

Subfamily Noordinae
Noorda blitealis Walker, 1859

Subfamily Nymphulinae
Ambia ptolycusalis Walker, 1859
Anydraula glycerialis (Walker, 1859)
Anydraula pericompsa (Turner, 1915)
Araeomorpha diplopa (Lower, 1903)
Araeomorpha limnophila Turner, 1937
Cataclysta camptozonale (Hampson, 1897)
Cataclysta lampetialis Walker, 1859
Cataclysta marginipuncta Turner, 1937
Cataclysta melanolitha (Turner, 1908)
Cataclysta metastictalis (Hampson, 1917)
Cataclysta polyrrapha Turner, 1937
Cataclysta psathyrodes Turner, 1908
Elophila aristodora (Turner, 1908)
Elophila difflualis (Snellen, 1880)
Elophila responsalis (Walker, 1866)
Eoophyla argyrilinale (Hampson, 1897)
Hygraula nitens (Butler, 1880)
Hygraula pelochyta Turner, 1937
Hylebatis scintillifera Turner, 1908
Margarosticha euprepialis Hampson, 1917
Margarosticha repetitalis (Warren, 1896)
Margarosticha sphenotis Meyrick, 1887
Neoschoenobia caustodes (Meyrick, 1934)
Nyctiplanes polypenthes Turner, 1937
Nymphicula adelphalis Agassiz, 2014
Nymphicula christinae Agassiz, 2014
Nymphicula conjunctalis Agassiz, 2014
Nymphicula edwardsi Agassiz, 2014
Nymphicula hampsoni Agassiz, 2014
Nymphicula ochrepunctalis Agassiz, 2014
Nymphicula queenslandica (Hampson, 1917)
Nymphicula torresalis Agassiz, 2014
Paracataclysta fuscalis (Hampson, 1893)
Parapoynx affinialis Guenée, 1854
Parapoynx crisonalis (Walker, 1859)
Parapoynx dentizonalis (Hampson, 1897)
Parapoynx diminutalis Snellen, 1880
Parapoynx discoloralis (Walker, 1866)
Parapoynx epimochla (Turner, 1908)
Parapoynx euryscia (Meyrick, 1885)
Parapoynx fluctuosalis (Zeller, 1952)
Parapoynx medusalis (Walker, 1859)
Parapoynx polydectalis (Walker, 1859)
Parapoynx sinuosa (T.P. Lucas, 1892)
Parapoynx stagnalis (Zeller, 1852)
Parapoynx tenebralis (Lower, 1902)
Parapoynx tullialis (Walker, 1859)
Parapoynx villidalis (Walker, 1859)
Strepsinoma amaura Meyrick, 1897
Strepsinoma foveata Turner, 1937
Tetrernia terminitis Meyrick, 1890
Theila distributa (T.P. Lucas, 1898)
Theila metallosticha (Turner, 1938)
Theila siennata (Warren, 1896)
Theila triplaga (Lower, 1903)

Subfamily Odontiinae
Autocharis hedyphaes (Turner, 1913)
Autocharis miltosoma (Turner, 1937)
Autocharis mimetica (Lower, 1903)
Autocharis molybdis (Lower, 1903)
Boeotarcha divisa (T.P. Lucas, 1894)
Boeotarcha taenialis (Snellen, 1880)
Canuza acmias Meyrick, 1897
Canuza euspilella Walker, 1866
Clupeosoma astrigalis Hampson, 1917
Clupeosoma pellucidalis Snellen, 1880
Eurrhypis pollinalis (Denis & Schiffermüller, 1775)
Hemiscopis violacea (T.P. Lucas, 1892)
Heortia vitessoides (Moore, 1885)
Hydrorybina polusalis (Walker, 1859)
Pseudonoorda hemileuca (Turner, 1933)
Pseudonoorda metalloma (Lower, 1903)
Syntonarcha iriastis Meyrick, 1890
Syntonarcha vulnerata T.P. Lucas, 1894
Taurometopa haematographa (Hampson, 1917)
Taurometopa phoenicozona (Hampson, 1917)
Thesaurica argentifera (Hampson, 1913)
Trigonoorda gavisalis (Walker, 1869)
Trigonoorda psarochroa (Turner, 1908)
Trigonoorda rhodea (Lower, 1905)
Trigonoorda rhodopa (Turner, 1908)
Trigonoorda trygoda (Meyrick, 1897)

Subfamily Peoriinae
Anchylobela acidnias (Turner, 1904)
Anchylobela dyseimata (Turner, 1913)
Anchylobela haplodes Turner, 1947
Anchylobela holophaea (Turner, 1905)
Anchylobela nitens (Butler, 1886)
Anchylobela phaulodes (Turner, 1947)
Comorta plinthina (Turner, 1905)
Comorta zophopleura (Turner, 1904)
Emmalocera apotomella (Meyrick, 1879)
Emmalocera approximella (Hampson, 1918)
Emmalocera biseriella (Hampson, 1901)
Emmalocera callirrhoda (Turner, 1904)
Emmalocera ctenucha (Turner, 1913)
Emmalocera dimochla (Turner, 1947)
Emmalocera distictella (Hampson, 1918)
Emmalocera eremochroa Hampson, 1918
Emmalocera eurysticha (Turner, 1904)
Emmalocera euryzona (Meyrick, 1883)
Emmalocera haploschema (Turner, 1904)
Emmalocera holochra (Turner, 1904)
Emmalocera icasmopis (Turner, 1904)
Emmalocera laropis (Turner, 1913)
Emmalocera latilimbella (Ragonot, 1890)
Emmalocera longiramella Hampson, 1901
Emmalocera macrorrhynca (Turner, 1923)
Emmalocera marcida (Turner, 1923)
Emmalocera minoralis (Lower, 1903)
Emmalocera neotomella (Meyrick, 1879)
Emmalocera niphopleura (Turner, 1913)
Emmalocera niphosema (Turner, 1913)
Emmalocera pelochroa (Turner, 1947)
Emmalocera platymochla (Turner, 1947)
Emmalocera pleurochorda (Turner, 1913)
Emmalocera radiatella Hampson, 1901
Emmalocera rhabdota (Turner, 1904)
Emmalocera rhodoessa (Turner, 1904)
Emmalocera stereosticha (Turner, 1905)
Emmalocera syssema (Turner, 1913)
Emmalocera thiomochla (Turner, 1947)
Emmalocera transecta (Turner, 1947)
Fossifrontia leuconeurella Hampson, 1901
Heosphora ablepta (Turner, 1913)
Heosphora achromatella (Hampson, 1918)
Heosphora anaemopis (Turner, 1913)
Heosphora baliora (Turner, 1913)
Heosphora colobela (Turner, 1947)
Heosphora desertella (Hampson, 1918)
Heosphora enervella (Hampson, 1901)
Heosphora erasmia (Turner, 1913)
Heosphora grammivena (Hampson, 1918)
Heosphora leuconeura (Turner, 1913)
Heosphora minimella (Hampson, 1901)
Heosphora neurica (Turner, 1913)
Heosphora psamathella (Meyrick, 1879)
Heosphora rhodochros (Turner, 1947)
Heosphora tanybela (Turner, 1947)
Heosphora virginella (Meyrick, 1879)
Heosphora xylodes (Turner, 1947)
Lioprosopa adenocera (Turner, 1923)
Lioprosopa albivena (Turner, 1947)
Lioprosopa amictodes (Turner, 1947)
Lioprosopa argosticha (Turner, 1913)
Lioprosopa haploa Turner, 1947
Lioprosopa microrrhoda (Turner, 1923)
Lioprosopa neuricella (Hampson, 1918)
Lioprosopa poliosticha Turner, 1947
Lioprosopa rhadinodes Turner, 1947
Lioprosopa rhantista Turner, 1947
Lioprosopa rhodobaphella (Ragonot, 1888)
Lioprosopa rhodosticha (Turner, 1904)

Subfamily Phycitinae

Anerastiini
Anerastia metallactis Meyrick, 1887
Calamotropa pulverivena Hampson, 1918

Cabniini
Ernophthora milicha Turner, 1931
Ernophthora phoenicias Meyrick, 1887
Ernophthora schematica (Turner, 1947)
Euageta dianipha (Lower, 1902)

Cryptoblabini
Balanomis encyclia Meyrick, 1887
Berastagia dissolutella (Snellen, 1880)
Cryptadia xuthobela Turner, 1913
Cryptoblabes adoceta Turner, 1904
Cryptoblabes albocostalis (T.P. Lucas, 1892)
Cryptoblabes alphitias Turner, 1913
Cryptoblabes euraphella (Meyrick, 1879)
Cryptoblabes hemigypsa Turner, 1913
Cryptoblabes plagioleuca Turner, 1904
Cryptoblabes poliella (Lower, 1905)
Procunea siderea Hampson, 1930

The following species belongs to the tribe Cryptoblabini, but has not been assigned to a genus yet. Given here is the original name given to the species when it was first described:
Cryptoblabes ferrealis Lower, 1902

Phycitini
Abareia amaurodes (Turner, 1947)
Acrobasis epaxia (Turner, 1947)
Acrobasis ereboscopa (Lower, 1903)
Acrobasis mniaropis (Turner, 1904)
Acrobasis olivalis (Hampson, 1896)
Addyme ferrorubella (Walker, 1864)
Ammatucha lathria Turner, 1922
Ancylodes lapsalis (Walker, 1859)
Ancylodes penicillata Turner, 1905
Ancylosis ianthemis (Meyrick, 1887)
Ancylosis rufifasciella (Hampson, 1901)
Ancylosis thiosticha Turner, 1947
Anonaepestis bengalella Ragonot, 1894
Arcola malloi Pastrana, 1961
Asarta fuliginosa (Turner, 1841)
Asclerobia flavitinctella (Ragonot, 1893)
Assara aterpes (Turner, 1913)
Assara cataxutha (Turner, 1947)
Assara chionopleura (Turner, 1947)
Assara holophragma (Meyrick, 1887)
Assara leucarma (Meyrick, 1879)
Assara melanomita (Turner, 1947)
Assara microdoxa (Meyrick, 1879)
Assara odontosema (Turner, 1913)
Assara proleuca (Lower, 1903)
Assara quadriguttella (Walker, 1866)
Assara semifictile (Turner, 1913)
Assara seminivale (Turner, 1904)
Assara subarcuella (Meyrick, 1879)
Aurana actiosella Walker, 1863
Barbifrontia hemileucella Hampson, 1901
Bradyrrhoa gilveolella (Treitschke, 1833)
Cactoblastis cactorum (Berg, 1885)
Cactoblastis doddi Heinrich, 1939
Cadra acuta Horak, 1994
Cadra cautella (Walker, 1863)
Cadra corniculata Horak, 1994
Cadra figulilella (Gregson, 1871)
Cadra perfasciata Horak, 1994
Cadra reniformis Horak, 1994
Cadra rugosa Horak, 1994
Calguia defiguralis Walker, 1863
Calguia deltophora (Lower, 1903)
Cathyalia fulvella Ragonot, 1888
Cathyalia pallicostalis (Walker, 1863)
Cavipalpia argentilavella (Hampson, 1901)
Ceutholopha petalocosma (Meyrick, 1882)
Conobathra corethropus (Turner, 1904)
Conobathra hemichlaena (Meyrick, 1887)
Copamyntis ceroprepiella (Hampson, 1901)
Copamyntis infusella (Meyrick, 1879)
Copamyntis leptocosma (Turner, 1904)
Copamyntis prays (Turner, 1947)
Copamyntis spodoptila (Turner, 1913)
Creobota apodectum (Turner, 1904)
Creobota grossipunctella (Ragonot, 1888)
Crocydopora cinigerella (Walker, 1866)
Cryptomyelois glaucobasis (Lower, 1903)
Ctenomeristis almella (Meyrick, 1879)
Ctenomeristis subfuscella (Hampson, 1901)
Dialepta micropolia Turner, 1913
Ecbletodes psephenias Turner, 1904
Ecnomoneura sphaerotropha Turner, 1942
Ectomyelois ceratoniae (Zeller, 1839)
Encryphodes aenictopa Turner, 1913
Ephestia elutella (Hübner, 1796)
Ephestia kuehniella (Zeller, 1879)
Ephestiopsis oenobarella (Meyrick, 1879)
Epicrocis metallopa (Lower, 1898)
Eremographa sebasmia (Meyrick, 1887)
Etiella behrii (Zeller, 1848)
Etiella chrysoporella Meyrick, 1879
Etiella grisea Hampson, 1903
Etiella hobsoni (Butler, 1881)
Etiella scitivittalis (Walker, 1863)
Etiella walsinghamella Ragonot, 1888
Etiella zinckenella (Treitschke, 1832)
Eucampyla etheiella Meyrick, 1882
Euzophera flavicosta Turner, 1947
Euzopherodes albicans Hampson, 1899
Euzopherodes allocrossa Lower, 1903
Euzopherodes homocapna Turner, 1947
Faveria dasyptera (Lower, 1903)
Faveria laiasalis Walker, 1859
Faveria leucophaeella (Zeller, 1867)
Faveria oppositalis (Walker, 1863)
Faveria tritalis (Walker, 1863)
Heterochrosis molybdophora (Lower, 1903)
Homoeosoma albicosta (Turner, 1947)
Homoeosoma atechna Turner, 1947
Homoeosoma centrosticha Turner, 1947
Homoeosoma contracta Turner, 1947
Homoeosoma fornacella (Meyrick, 1879)
Homoeosoma ischnopa (Turner, 1947)
Homoeosoma lechriosema Turner, 1947
Homoeosoma pelosticta Turner, 1947
Homoeosoma phaulopa (Turner, 1947)
Homoeosoma stenopis Turner, 1904
Homoeosoma vagella Zeller, 1848
Hypargyria metalliferella Ragonot, 1888
Hypsipyla robusta (Moore, 1886)
Indomalayia flabellifera (Hampson, 1896)
Indomyrlaea auchmodes (Turner, 1905)
Lasiosticha antelia (Meyrick, 1885)
Lasiosticha canilinea (Meyrick, 1879)
Lasiosticha microcosma Lower, 1893
Lasiosticha opimella (Meyrick, 1879)
Lasiosticha thermochroa (Lower, 1896)
Lophothoracia omphalella Hampson, 1901
Lophothoracia orthozona (Lower, 1903)
Magiria imparella Zeller, 1867
Medaniaria adiacritis (Turner, 1904)
Melitara dentata (Grote, 1876)
Melitara prodenialis Walker, 1863
Mesciniadia aenicta (Turner, 1913)
Mesciniadia infractalis (Walker, 1864)
Mesciniadia otoptila (Turner, 1913)
Metallosticha pamphaes (Turner, 1904)
Meyrickiella homosema (Meyrick, 1887)
Nephopterix capnoessa (Turner, 1904)
Nephopterix chryserythra (Lower, 1902)
Nephopterix habrostola Lower, 1905
Nephopterix hemibaphes (Turner, 1905)
Nephopterix melanostyla Meyrick, 1879
Nephopterix piratis (Meyrick, 1887)
Nephopterix placoxantha (Lower, 1898)
Nephopterix thermalopha Lower, 1903
Olycella junctolineella (Hulst, 1900)
Oxydisia hyperythrella Hampson, 1901
Parramatta ensiferella (Meyrick, 1879)
Parramatta taliella (Hampson, 1901)
Patagoniodes farinaria (Turner, 1904)
Phycita eulepidella Hampson, 1896
Phycita rhapta (Turner, 1947)
Phycita trachystola Turner, 1904
Phycitodes delineata (T.P. Lucas, 1892)
Phycitodes melanosticta (Lower, 1903)
Plodia interpunctella (Hübner, 1813)
Protoetiella cryptadia (Turner, 1913)
Protoetiella venustella (Hampson, 1896)
Ptyobathra atrisquamella (Hampson, 1901)
Ptyobathra hades (Lower, 1903)
Ptyobathra hypolepidota Turner, 1905
Ptyomaxia amaura (Lower, 1902)
Ptyomaxia metasarca (Lower, 1903)
Ptyomaxia syntaractis Turner, 1904
Ptyomaxia trigonogramma (Turner, 1947)
Sempronia stygella Ragonot, 1888
Stereobela leucomera Turner, 1905
Symphonistis monospila (Lower, 1902)
Syntypica aleurodes Turner, 1905
Syntypica phaeochiton (Turner, 1947)
Syntypica stereochorda (Turner, 1947)
Trissonca mesactella (Meyrick, 1879)
Trychnocrana abditiva Turner, 1925
Trychnocrana mixoleuca (Turner, 1904)
Tucumania tapiacola Dyar, 1925
Tylochares cosmiella (Meyrick, 1879)
Tylochares endophaga Turner, 1947
Tylochares eremonoma Turner, 1913
Tylochares goniosticha Turner, 1915
Tylochares gypsotypa Turner, 1947
Tylochares melanodes (Hampson, 1930)
Tylochares sceptucha Turner, 1904
Unadillides distichella (Meyrick, 1878)
Unadophanes apatelia (Turner, 1905)
Unadophanes atecmarta (Turner, 1913)
Unadophanes trissomita (Turner, 1913)
Vinicia gypsopa (Meyrick, 1883)
Vinicia macrota (Meyrick, 1887)

The following species belong to the tribe Phycitini, but have not been assigned to a genus yet. Given here is the original name given to the species when it was first described:
Salebria eucometis Meyrick, 1882
Epicrocis mesembrina Meyrick, 1887
Pempelia oculiferella Meyrick, 1879
Epicrocis poliochyta Turner, 1924

Unplaced to tribe
Masthala favillalella Walker, 1864

Subfamily Pyralinae

Pyralini
Aglossa caprealis (Hübner, 1809)
Aglossa pinguinalis (Linnaeus, 1758)
Amphiderita pyrospila Turner, 1925
Arescoptera idiotypa Turner, 1911
Arippara disticha (Turner, 1904)
Cardamyla carinentalis Walker, 1859
Cardamyla didymalis Walker, 1859
Cardamyla eurycroca Turner, 1937
Cardamyla hercophora (Meyrick, 1884)
Curena caustopa (Turner, 1905)
Curena externalis Walker, 1866
Gauna aegusalis (Walker, 1858)
Gauna flavibasalis (Hampson, 1906)
Gauna phaealis (Hampson, 1906)
Herculia nigrivitta (Walker, 1863)
Hypsopygia flavamaculata Shaffer, Nielsen & Horak, 1996
Hypsopygia mauritialis (Boisduval, 1833)
Loryma recusata (Walker, 1863)
Macna coelocrossa (Turner, 1911)
Macna oppositalis (Walker, 1866)
Ocrasa acerasta (Turner, 1904)
Ocrasa albidalis Walker, 1866
Ocrasa chytriodes (Turner, 1911)
Ocrasa decoloralis (Lederer, 1863)
Ocrasa repetita (Butler, 1887)
Perisseretma orthotis (Meyrick, 1894)
Pyralis caustica (Meyrick, 1884)
Pyralis farinalis Linnaeus, 1758
Pyralis manihotalis Guenée, 1854
Pyralis pictalis (Curtis, 1834)
Scenedra decoratalis (Walker, 1866)
Scenidiopis chionozyga (Lower, 1903)
Tanaobela chrysochlora Turner, 1915
Vitessa glaucoptera Hampson, 1906
Vitessa plumosa Hampson, 1896
Vitessa zemire (Stoll, 1781)

Subfamily Pyraustinae

Pyraustini
Achyra affinitalis (Lederer, 1863)
Achyra massalis (Walker, 1859)
Achyra nigrirenalis (Hampson, 1913)
Achyra serrulata (Turner, 1932)
Circobotys occultilinea (Walker, 1863)
Coelobathra ochromorpha (Lower, 1902)
Crypsiptya coclesalis (Walker, 1859)
Ebulea epicroca (Lower, 1903)
Ebulea perflavalis (Hampson, 1913)
Emphylica xanthocrossa Turner, 1913
Euclasta gigantalis Viette, 1957
Euclasta maceratalis Lederer, 1863
Hyalobathra aequalis (Lederer, 1863)
Hyalobathra archeleuca Meyrick, 1885
Hyalobathra brevialis (Walker, 1859)
Hyalobathra illectalis (Walker, 1859)
Hyalobathra minialis (Warren, 1895)
Hyalobathra miniosalis (Guenée, 1854)
Hyalobathra paupellalis (Lederer, 1863)
Isocentris charopalis Swinhoe, 1907
Isocentris filalis (Guenée, 1854)
Lamprophaia ablactalis (Walker, 1859)
Lamprophaia albifimbrialis (Walker, 1866)
Loxomorpha flavidissimalis (Grote, 1878)
Mabra eryxalis (Walker, 1859)
Ostrinia furnacalis (Guenée, 1854)
Pagyda botydalis (Snellen, 1880)
Pagyda schaliphora Hampson, 1898
Paliga damastesalis (Walker, 1859)
Paliga ignealis (Walker, 1866)
Paliga mandronalis (Walker, 1859)
Paliga quadrigalis (Hering, 1901)
Paliga rubicundalis Warren, 1896
Pyrausta ignealis (Hampson, 1899)
Pyrausta oenochrois (Meyrick, 1889)
Pyrausta panopealis (Walker, 1859)
Pyrausta testalis (Fabricius, 1794)
Uresiphita insulicola (Turner, 1918)
Uresiphita ornithopteralis (Guenée, 1854)

Spilomelini
Aboetheta pteridonoma Turner, 1914
Acicys cladaropa Turner, 1911
Aethaloessa calidalis (Guenée, 1854)
Aetholix flavibasalis (Guenée, 1854)
Agathodes paliscia Turner, 1908
Agrioglypta deliciosa (Butler, 1887)
Agrioglypta eurytusalis (Walker, 1859)
Agrioglypta excelsalis (Walker, 1866)
Agrioglypta itysalis (Walker, 1859)
Agrioglypta zelimalis (Walker, 1859)
Agrotera amathealis (Walker, 1859)
Agrotera basinotata Hampson, 1891
Agrotera glycyphanes Turner, 1913
Agrotera ignepicta Hampson, 1898
Agrotera pictalis (Warren, 1896)
Analyta albicillalis Lederer, 1863
Antigastra catalaunalis (Duponchel, 1833)
Aphytoceros lucusalis (Walker, 1859)
Aporocosmus lamprodeta (Meyrick, 1886)
Archernis callixantha Meyrick, 1886
Arthroschista hilaralis (Walker, 1859)
Arxama cretacealis Hampson, 1906
Ategumia adipalis (Lederer, 1863)
Atelocentra chloraspis Meyrick, 1884
Auchmophoba tynnuta Turner, 1913
Bacotoma camillusalis (Walker, 1859)
Bocchoris artificalis (Lederer, 1863)
Botyodes asialis Guenée, 1854
Bradina admixtalis (Walker, 1859)
Bradina mannusalis (Walker, 1859)
Camptomastix hisbonalis (Walker, 1859)
Cangetta ammochroa Turner, 1915
Cangetta aurantiaca Hampson, 1906
Cangetta haematera (Turner, 1937)
Cangetta hartoghialis (Snellen, 1872)
Caprinia felderi Lederer, 1863
Chabula acamasalis (Walker, 1859)
Chalcidoptera emissalis (Walker, 1866)
Chrysothyridia invertalis (Snellen, 1877)
Cirrhochrista annulifera Hampson, 1919
Cirrhochrista arcusalis (Walker, 1859)
Cirrhochrista caconalis Swinhoe, 1900
Cirrhochrista cyclophora Lower, 1903
Cirrhochrista punctulata Hampson, 1896
Cissachroa callischema Turner, 1937
Cnaphalocrocis araealis (Hampson, 1912)
Cnaphalocrocis bilinealis (Hampson, 1891)
Cnaphalocrocis hexagona (Lower, 1903)
Cnaphalocrocis loxodesma (Turner, 1915)
Cnaphalocrocis medinalis (Guenée, 1854)
Cnaphalocrocis poeyalis (Boisduval, 1833)
Cnaphalocrocis suspicalis (Walker, 1859)
Conogethes diminutiva Warren, 1896
Conogethes ersealis (Walker, 1859)
Conogethes haemactalis Snellen, 1890
Conogethes pluto (Butler, 1887)
Conogethes punctiferalis (Guenée, 1854)
Conogethes semifascialis (Walker, 1866)
Conogethes tharsalea (Meyrick, 1887)
Coptobasis lunalis (Guenée, 1854)
Cotachena aluensis (Butler, 1887)
Cotachena fuscimarginalis Hampson, 1916
Cotachena hicana (Turner, 1915)
Cotachena histricalis (Walker, 1859)
Criophthona anerasmia (Turner, 1913)
Criophthona baliocrossa (Turner, 1913)
Criophthona celidota (Turner, 1913)
Criophthona ecista (Turner, 1913)
Criophthona finitima Meyrick, 1884
Criophthona haliaphra Meyrick, 1884
Criophthona trileuca Lower, 1903
Cydalima diaphanalis (Walker, 1866)
Cydalima laticostalis (Guenée, 1854)
Desmia discrepans (Butler, 1887)
Deuterarcha xanthomela Meyrick, 1884
Diaphania indica (Saunders, 1851)
Diasemia accalis (Walker, 1859)
Diasemia completalis Walker, 1866
Diasemiopsis ramburialis (Duponchel, 1834)
Diathrausta ochreipennis (Butler, 1886)
Diathrausta picata (Butler, 1889)
Dichocrocis clytusalis (Walker, 1859)
Dichocrocis erixantha (Meyrick, 1886)
Didymostoma aurotinctalis (Hampson, 1898)
Diplopseustis perieresalis (Walker, 1859)
Diplopseustis prophetica Meyrick, 1887
Dracaenura horochroa Meyrick, 1886
Dysallacta megalopa (Meyrick, 1889)
Dysallacta mesozona (Lower, 1901)
Dysallacta negatalis (Walker, 1859)
Ectadiosoma straminea (T.P. Lucas, 1892)
Eudaimonisma batchelorella T.P. Lucas, 1902
Eurrhyparodes bracteolalis (Zeller, 1852)
Eurrhyparodes tricoloralis (Zeller, 1852)
Eurybela scotopis Turner, 1908
Eurybela trophoessa (Turner, 1908)
Eusabena monostictalis (Hampson, 1899)
Eusabena paraphragma (Meyrick, 1889)
Filodes fulvibasalis Hampson, 1898
Glauconoe deductalis (Walker, 1859)
Glycythyma chrysorycta (Meyrick, 1884)
Glycythyma leonina (Butler, 1886)
Glycythyma thymedes Turner, 1908
Glycythyma xanthoscota (Lower, 1903)
Glyphodes apiospila (Turner, 1922)
Glyphodes bicolor (Swainson, 1821)
Glyphodes bivitralis Guenée, 1854
Glyphodes callipona (Turner, 1908)
Glyphodes canthusalis Walker, 1859
Glyphodes conjunctalis Walker, 1866
Glyphodes cosmarcha Meyrick, 1887
Glyphodes doleschalii Lederer, 1863
Glyphodes flavizonalis Hampson, 1898
Glyphodes margaritaria (Clerck, 1764)
Glyphodes microta Meyrick, 1889
Glyphodes multilinealis Kenrick, 1907
Glyphodes onychinalis (Guenée, 1854)
Glyphodes pulverulentalis Hampson, 1896
Glyphodes stolalis Guenée, 1854
Haritalodes derogata (Fabricius, 1775)
Herpetogramma cynaralis (Walker, 1859)
Herpetogramma dilatatipes (Walker, 1866)
Herpetogramma exculta (T.P. Lucas, 1892)
Herpetogramma hipponalis (Walker, 1859)
Herpetogramma holophaea (Hampson, 1898)
Herpetogramma licarsisalis (Walker, 1859)
Herpetogramma piasusalis (Walker, 1859)
Herpetogramma platycapna (Meyrick, 1897)
Herpetogramma stultalis (Walker, 1859)
Herpetogramma submarginalis (Swinhoe, 1901)
Herpetogramma zophosticta (Turner, 1915)
Hydriris chalybitis Meyrick, 1885
Hydriris ornatalis (Duponchel, 1832)
Hymenia perspectalis (Hübner, 1796)
Hymenoptychis sordida Zeller, 1852
Ischnurges illustralis Lederer, 1863
Leucinodes orbonalis Guenée, 1854
Lipararchis aspilus (Turner, 1915)
Lipararchis tranquillalis (Lederer, 1863)
Macaretaera hesperis Meyrick, 1886
Macrobela phaeophasma Turner, 1939
Maruca vitrata (Fabricius, 1787)
Meroctena staintonii Lederer, 1863
Merodictya marmorata (T.P. Lucas, 1892)
Metallarcha achoeusalis (Walker, 1859)
Metallarcha aureodiscalis (Hampson, 1918)
Metallarcha beatalis (R. Felder & Rogenhofer, 1875)
Metallarcha calliaspis Meyrick, 1884
Metallarcha chrysitis Turner, 1941
Metallarcha crocanthes Lower, 1896
Metallarcha diplochrysa Meyrick, 1884
Metallarcha epichrysa Meyrick, 1884
Metallarcha erromena (Turner, 1908)
Metallarcha eurychrysa Meyrick, 1884
Metallarcha leucodetis Lower, 1899
Metallarcha phaenolis Turner, 1913
Metallarcha pseliota Meyrick, 1887
Metallarcha tetraplaca Meyrick, 1887
Metallarcha thiophara Turner, 1917
Metallarcha zygosema Lower, 1897
Metasia acharis Meyrick, 1889
Metasia achroa (Lower, 1903)
Metasia aphrarcha (Meyrick, 1887)
Metasia ateloxantha (Meyrick, 1887)
Metasia capnochroa (Meyrick, 1884)
Metasia celaenophaes (Turner, 1913)
Metasia delotypa (Turner, 1913)
Metasia dicealis (Walker, 1859)
Metasia ectodontalis Lower, 1903
Metasia familiaris (Meyrick, 1884)
Metasia harmodia (Meyrick, 1887)
Metasia hemicirca (Meyrick, 1887)
Metasia homogama (Meyrick, 1887)
Metasia homophaea (Meyrick, 1885)
Metasia liophaea (Meyrick, 1887)
Metasia ochrochoa (Meyrick, 1887)
Metasia orphnopis Turner, 1915
Metasia pharisalis (Walker, 1859)
Metasia phragmatias Lower, 1903
Metasia polytima Turner, 1908
Metasia spilocrossa (Turner, 1913)
Metasia strangalota (Meyrick, 1887)
Metasia tiasalis (Walker, 1859)
Metasia triplex (Turner, 1913)
Metasia typhodes Turner, 1908
Metasia xenogama (Meyrick, 1884)
Metasia zinckenialis Hampson, 1899
Metasia zophophanes (Turner, 1937)
Metoeca foedalis (Guenée, 1854)
Myriostephes asphycta (Turner, 1915)
Myriostephes crocobapta Turner, 1908
Myriostephes haplodes (Meyrick, 1887)
Myriostephes leucostictalis (Hampson, 1899)
Myriostephes matura Meyrick, 1884
Myriostephes rubriceps (Hampson, 1903)
Myrmidonistis hoplora Meyrick, 1887
Nacoleia alincia Turner, 1908
Nacoleia amphicedalis (Walker, 1859)
Nacoleia charesalis (Walker, 1859)
Nacoleia glageropa Turner, 1908
Nacoleia megaspilalis Hampson, 1912
Nacoleia mesochlora (Meyrick, 1884)
Nacoleia obliqualis Hampson, 1898
Nacoleia octasema (Meyrick, 1886)
Nacoleia oncophragma Turner, 1908
Nacoleia parapsephis (Meyrick, 1887)
Nacoleia rhoeoalis (Walker, 1859)
Nacoleia syngenica Turner, 1913
Nausinoe geometralis (Guenée, 1854)
Nausinoe globulipedalis (Walker, 1866)
Nausinoe pueritia (Cramer, 1780)
Niphograpta albiguttalis (Warren, 1889)
Nomophila corticalis (Walker, 1869)
Nosophora dispilalis Hampson, 1896
Nosophora fulvalis Hampson, 1898
Nosophora hypsalis (Walker, 1866)
Notarcha aurolinealis (Walker, 1859)
Notarcha chrysoplasta Meyrick, 1884
Notarcha obrinusalis (Walker, 1859)
Notarcha polytimeta (Turner, 1915)
Omiodes basalticalis (Lederer, 1863)
Omiodes chrysampyx (Turner, 1908)
Omiodes diemenalis (Guenée, 1854)
Omiodes dispilotalis (Walker, 1866)
Omiodes granulata (Warren, 1896)
Omiodes indicata (Fabricius, 1775)
Omiodes nigriscripta Warren, 1896
Omiodes odontosticta (Hampson, 1898)
Omiodes origoalis (Walker, 1859)
Omiodes poeonalis (Walker, 1859)
Omiodes surrectalis (Walker, 1866)
Omphisa variegata Kenrick, 1912
Orphanostigma abruptalis (Walker, 1859)
Orphanostigma angustale Hampson, 1893
Orphanostigma perfulvalis (Hampson, 1899)
Orphnophanes eucerusalis (Walker, 1859)
Orthospila orissusalis (Walker, 1859)
Osiriaca ptousalis (Walker, 1859)
Otiophora clavifera (Hampson, 1899)
Otiophora leucotypa (Lower, 1903)
Otiophora leucura (Lower, 1903)
Pachynoa xanthochyta (Turner, 1933)
Palpita annulata (Fabricius, 1794)
Palpita horakae Inoue, 1997
Palpita hyaloptila (Turner, 1915)
Palpita limbata (Butler, 1886)
Palpita margaritacea Inoue, 1997
Palpita obsolescens Inoue, 1997
Palpita pajnii Kirti & Rose, 1992
Palpita pratti (Janse, 1924)
Palpita rhodocosta Inoue, 1997
Palpita uedai Inoue, 1997
Palpita unionalis (Hübner, 1796)
Pardomima amyntusalis (Walker, 1859)
Pardomima pompusalis (Walker, 1859)
Parotis atlitalis (Walker, 1859)
Parotis incurvata (Warren, 1896)
Parotis marginata (Hampson, 1893)
Parotis marinata (Fabricius, 1784)
Parotis pomonalis (Guenée, 1854)
Parotis punctiferalis (Walker, 1866)
Parotis suralis (Lederer, 1863)
Patania aedilis (Meyrick, 1887)
Piletocera albimixtalis Hampson, 1917
Piletocera chlorura (Meyrick, 1887)
Piletocera macroperalis Hampson, 1897
Piletocera meekii (T.P. Lucas, 1894)
Pleuroptya balteata (Fabricius, 1798)
Pleuroptya emmetris (Turner, 1915)
Pleuroptya symphonodes (Turner, 1913)
Pleuroptya tenuis (Warren, 1896)
Pleuroptya ultimalis (Walker, 1859)
Prooedema inscisalis (Walker, 1866)
Prophantis adusta Inoue, 1986
Prophantis androstigmata (Hampson, 1918)
Prorodes mimica Swinhoe, 1894
Protonoceras argocephala (Lower, 1903)
Protonoceras eucosma (Turner, 1908)
Protonoceras leucocosma (Turner, 1908)
Protonoceras mitis (Turner, 1937)
Pycnarmon aripanalis (Hampson, 1898)
Pycnarmon cribrata (Fabricius, 1794)
Pycnarmon jaguaralis (Guenée, 1854)
Pycnarmon meritalis (Walker, 1859)
Pygospila bivittalis Walker, 1866
Pygospila hyalotypa Turner, 1908
Pygospila tyres (Cramer, 1780)
Rehimena auritincta (Butler, 1886)
Rehimena cissophora (Turner, 1908)
Rehimena leptophaes (Turner, 1913)
Rehimena surusalis (Walker, 1859)
Rhectothyris rosea (Warren, 1896)
Rhimphalea lindusalis (Walker, 1859)
Rhimphalea sceletalis Lederer, 1863
Rhimphaliodes macrostigma Hampson, 1893
Salbia haemorrhoidalis Guenée, 1854
Samea multiplicalis (Guenée, 1854)
Sameodes cancellalis (Zeller, 1852)
Sameodes iolealis (Walker, 1859)
Sceliodes cordalis (Doubleday, 1843)
Sedenia achroa Lower, 1902
Sedenia aspasta Meyrick, 1887
Sedenia atacta (Turner, 1942)
Sedenia cervalis Guenée, 1854
Sedenia erythrura Lower, 1893
Sedenia leucogramma Turner, 1937
Sedenia mesochorda Turner, 1917
Sedenia polydesma Lower, 1900
Sedenia rupalis Guenée, 1854
Sedenia xeroscopa Lower, 1900
Sericophylla nivalis Turner, 1937
Sisyrophora pfeifferae Lederer, 1863
Spoladea recurvalis (Fabricius, 1775)
Stemorrhages amphitritalis (Guenée, 1854)
Stemorrhages marthesiusalis (Walker, 1859)
Sufetula alychnopa (Turner, 1908)
Sufetula hemiophthalma (Meyrick, 1884)
Syllepte ageneta Turner, 1908
Syllepte eriopisalis (Walker, 1859)
Syllepte leucodontia Hampson, 1898
Syllepte nigriscriptalis (Warren, 1896)
Syllepte ochrotozona Hampson, 1898
Syllepte phaeopleura Turner, 1922
Syllepte phricosticha Turner, 1908
Syllepte placophaea Turner, 1915
Syllepte plumifera Hampson, 1898
Syllepte polydonta Hampson, 1898
Syllepte ridopalis (Swinhoe, 1892)
Syllepte subaenescens (Warren, 1896)
Syllepte tenebrosalis (Warren, 1896)
Syllepte trachelota Turner, 1913
Symmoracma minoralis (Snellen, 1880)
Tabidia inconsequens (Warren, 1896)
Tabidia insanalis Snellen, 1880
Tabidia truncatalis Hampson, 1898
Talanga sabacusalis (Walker, 1859)
Talanga tolumnialis (Walker, 1859)
Tatobotys biannulalis (Walker, 1866)
Tatobotys janapalis (Walker, 1859)
Terastia subjectalis Lederer, 1863
Tetridia caletoralis (Walker, 1859)
Torqueola hypolampra Turner, 1915
Torqueola monophaes (Lower, 1902)
Trigonobela nebridopepla Turner, 1915
Trigonobela perfenestrata (Butler, 1882)
Tyspanodes creaghi Hampson, 1898
Tyspanodes hemileucalis (Hampson, 1897)
Tyspanodes linealis (Moore, 1867)
Tyspanodes metachrysialis Lower, 1903
Udea hyalistis (Lower, 1902)
Voliba asphyctopa Turner, 1908
Voliba leptomorpha Turner, 1908
Voliba psammoessa Turner, 1908
Voliba pycnosticta Turner, 1908
Voliba scoparialis (Walker, 1866)
Zagiridia noctualis Hampson, 1897

The following species belongs to the tribe Spilomelini, but has not been assigned to a genus yet. Given here is the original name given to the species when it was first described:
Dipticophora kuphitincta T.P. Lucas, 1898

Subfamily Schoenobiinae
Catagela adoceta Common, 1960
Chionobosca actinopis Turner, 1911
Helonastes acentrus Common, 1960
Niphadoses elachia Common, 1960
Niphadoses hoplites Common, 1960
Niphadoses palleucus Common, 1960
Patissa atricostalis Hampson, 1919
Patissa pentamita (Turner, 1911)
Patissa stenopteralis Hampson, 1919
Patissa tinctalis (Hampson, 1919)
Scirpophaga excerptalis (Walker, 1863)
Scirpophaga imparellus (Meyrick, 1878)
Scirpophaga innotata (Walker, 1863)
Scirpophaga melanostigmus (Turner, 1922)
Scirpophaga nivella (Fabricius, 1794)
Scirpophaga ochroleuca Meyrick, 1882
Scirpophaga percna Common, 1960
Scirpophaga phaedima Common, 1960
Scirpophaga praelata (Scopoli, 1763)
Scirpophaga xantharrenes Common, 1960
Tipanaea patulella Walker, 1863

Subfamily Scopariinae

Heliothelini
Heliothela aterrima Turner, 1937
Heliothela didymospila Turner, 1915
Heliothela floricola Turner, 1913
Heliothela ophideresana (Walker, 1863)
Heliothela oreias Turner, 1915
Heliothela paracentra (Meyrick, 1887)

Hoploscopini
Perimeceta niphospila (Turner, 1932)
Perimeceta niphotypa Turner, 1915

Scopariini
Eclipsiodes anthomera (Lower, 1896)
Eclipsiodes crypsixantha Meyrick, 1884
Eclipsiodes homora Turner, 1908
Eclipsiodes orthogramma (Lower, 1902)
Eclipsiodes schizodesma (Lower, 1899)
Eclipsiodes semigilva Turner, 1922
Notocrambus cuprealis (Hampson, 1907)
Notocrambus holomelas Turner, 1922
Phanomorpha acrocapna (Turner, 1915)
Phanomorpha dapsilis (Turner, 1908)
Phanomorpha drosera (Meyrick, 1887)
Phanomorpha icelomorpha (Turner, 1908)
Phanomorpha marmaropa (Meyrick, 1889)
Phanomorpha meliphyrta (Turner, 1908)
Phanomorpha orthogramma (Lower, 1902)
Phanomorpha pammicta (Turner, 1908)
Phanomorpha persumptana (Walker, 1863)
Phenacodes aleuropa (Lower, 1903)
Phenacodes vegetata (T.P. Lucas, 1901)
Scoparia acropola Meyrick, 1884
Scoparia anaplecta Meyrick, 1884
Scoparia anisophragma Lower, 1901
Scoparia anthracias Meyrick, 1884
Scoparia aphrodes Meyrick, 1884
Scoparia arcta T.P. Lucas, 1898
Scoparia argolina (Lower, 1902)
Scoparia australialis Guenée, 1854
Scoparia australiensis (Hampson, 1898)
Scoparia axiolecta Turner, 1922
Scoparia charopoea Turner, 1908
Scoparia chiasta Meyrick, 1884
Scoparia citrochroa (Turner, 1908)
Scoparia cleodoralis (Walker, 1859)
Scoparia contempta (Turner, 1927)
Scoparia crocospila Turner, 1922
Scoparia crypserythra (Lower, 1901)
Scoparia deliniens T.P. Lucas, 1898
Scoparia emmetropis Turner, 1915
Scoparia epicryma Meyrick, 1884
Scoparia epigypsa (Lower, 1902)
Scoparia eremitis Meyrick, 1884
Scoparia erythroneura (Turner, 1937)
Scoparia eumeles Meyrick, 1884
Scoparia eutacta Turner, 1931
Scoparia exhibitalis Walker, 1865
Scoparia favilliferella (Walker, 1866)
Scoparia gethosyna Turner, 1922
Scoparia gomphota Meyrick, 1884
Scoparia homala Meyrick, 1884
Scoparia hypoxantha Lower, 1896
Scoparia ischnoptera Turner, 1922
Scoparia ithyntis Turner, 1922
Scoparia leucomela Lower, 1893
Scoparia leuconota (Lower, 1902)
Scoparia lichenopa Lower, 1897
Scoparia melanoxantha Turner, 1922
Scoparia mesogramma Lower, 1900
Scoparia meyrickii (Butler, 1882)
Scoparia nephelitis (Meyrick, 1887)
Scoparia niphetodes Turner, 1931
Scoparia objurgalis Guenée, 1854
Scoparia ochrophara Turner, 1915
Scoparia oxycampyla (Turner, 1937)
Scoparia oxygona Meyrick, 1897
Scoparia paracycla (Lower, 1902)
Scoparia pediopola (Turner, 1937)
Scoparia perierga Meyrick, 1884
Scoparia philonephes (Meyrick, 1884)
Scoparia plagiotis Meyrick, 1887
Scoparia platymera Lower, 1905
Scoparia protorthra Meyrick, 1885
Scoparia spelaea Meyrick, 1884
Scoparia stenopa Lower, 1902
Scoparia striatalis (Hampson, 1907)
Scoparia susanae Lower, 1900
Scoparia synapta Meyrick, 1884
Scoparia syntaracta Meyrick, 1884
Scoparia threnodes Meyrick, 1887
Scoparia tristicta Turner, 1922

Subfamily Wurthiinae
Niphopyralis chionesis Hampson, 1919

External links 
Pyralidae at Australian Faunal Directory

Australia